The Jäger Movement consisted of volunteers from Finland who trained in Germany as Jägers (elite light infantry) during World War I. Supported by Germany to enable the creation of a Finnish sovereign state, the movement was one of many means by which Germany intended to weaken Russia and to cause Russia's loss of its western provinces and dependencies.

History

The recruitment of the Jäger volunteers from the Grand Duchy of Finland was clandestine and dominated by Germany-influenced circles, such as university students and the Finnish upper middle class. The recruitment was however in no way exclusive. In all, over 1,100 volunteers are estimated to have "slipped off" to train in Germany.

The recruits were transported across Finland's western border via Sweden to Germany, where they were formed into the Royal Prussian 27th Jäger Battalion. The Jäger Battalion fought in the ranks of the German Army from 1916 in the battles on the northern flank of the eastern front.

After the outbreak of the Civil War in Finland  the Jägers were engaged on the "White" (non-communist) side in the war and formed the nucleus of the new Finnish Army. In Finland, these 2,000 volunteers were simply called The Jägers (Finnish pl. Jääkärit).

Their contribution to the White victory was crucial, not least through improving morale. Educated as elite troops they were also fit to assume command as officers over the untrained troops of the Civil War.

Immediately after the Civil War, they were given the right to use the word Jäger in their military ranks. Many of the Jägers continued their military careers. In the 1920s a long feud between officers with Jäger-background and Finnish officers who had served in the Russian Imperial army was concluded in favor of the Jägers: Most of the commanders of army corps, divisions, and regiments in the Winter War were Jägers. The Jäger March composed by Jean Sibelius for the words written by Jäger Heikki Nurmio, was the honorary march of many army detachments.

Conflict with Mannerheim
The Jäger conflict derived from rising tensions (short of armed conflict) between German-influenced Jägers and politicians who looked to Germany as their ally on one side, and the faction centered on former Russian General and Finnish Commander-in-Chief Baron Gustaf Mannerheim on the other side. The Mannerheim side was oriented towards an alliance with Sweden, which remained neutral during the war but which was opposed to Russia, and with which Finland shared its history up to 1809. Mannerheim, who was from a Finland Swedish family, was respected among Finns, Russians, and Swedes alike. Baron Mannerheim and some of the Swedish speaking officers of the Finnish Army left Finland as a direct consequence of this conflict, as the Finnish senate elected a German prince as King of Finland and would have made Finland a monarchy. However, the kingdom was never realized beyond this election; and when World War I ended and the German Kaiser fled, the nascent Finnish monarchy was replaced by a republic, whereupon Baron Mannerheim returned.

Today
At the present time, infantry in the Finnish Army are designated either as infantry or Jäger troops, specifically mechanized infantry or motorised infantry using APCs or vehicles such as Sisu Nasu. Mechanized infantry using IFVs are called panssarijääkäri or Armoured Jäger. Several other variations exist, including Finnish Navy Coastal Jäger (Marine), Guard's Jäger of the Guard Jaeger Regiment, in special forces (Para) Jäger, Special Jäger, and in the Border Guard border jäger and special border jäger.

See also 
 Russification of Finland
 Kagal (Finnish society)

References

Finnish Civil War
Anti-communist organizations